Supercritical carbon dioxide (s) is a fluid state of carbon dioxide where it is held at or above its critical temperature and critical pressure.

Carbon dioxide usually behaves as a gas in air at standard temperature and pressure (STP), or as a solid called dry ice when cooled and/or pressurised sufficiently. If the temperature and pressure are both increased from STP to be at or above the critical point for carbon dioxide, it can adopt properties midway between a gas and a liquid. More specifically, it behaves as a supercritical fluid above its critical temperature and critical pressure, expanding to fill its container like a gas but with a density like that of a liquid.

Supercritical  is becoming an important commercial and industrial solvent due to its role in chemical extraction in addition to its relatively  low toxicity and environmental impact. The relatively low temperature of the process and the stability of  also allows most compounds to be extracted with little damage or denaturing. In addition, the solubility of many extracted compounds in  varies with pressure, permitting selective extractions.

Applications

Solvent

Carbon dioxide is gaining popularity among coffee manufacturers looking to move away from classic decaffeinating solvents. s is forced through the green coffee beans which are then sprayed with water at high pressure to remove the caffeine. The caffeine can then be isolated for resale (e.g. to the pharmaceutical or beverage manufacturers) by passing the water through activated charcoal filters or by distillation, crystallization or reverse osmosis. Supercritical carbon dioxide is used to remove organochloride pesticides and metals from agricultural crops without adulterating the desired constituents from the plant matter in the herbal supplement industry.

Supercritical carbon dioxide can be used as a more environmentally friendly solvent for dry cleaning over traditional solvents such as chlorocarbons, including perchloroethylene.

Supercritical carbon dioxide is used as the extraction solvent for creation of essential oils and other herbal distillates. Its main advantages over solvents such as hexane and acetone in this process are that it is non-flammable and does not leave toxic residue.  Furthermore, separation of the reaction components from the starting material is much simpler than with traditional organic solvents. The  can evaporate into the air or be recycled by condensation into a cold recovery vessel. Its advantage over steam distillation is that it operates at a lower temperature, which can separate the plant waxes from the oils.

In laboratories, s is used as an extraction solvent, for example for determining total recoverable hydrocarbons from soils, sediments, fly-ash and other media, and determination of polycyclic aromatic hydrocarbons in soil and solid wastes. Supercritical fluid extraction has been used in determining hydrocarbon components in water.

Processes that use s to produce micro and nano scale particles, often for pharmaceutical uses, are under development. The gas antisolvent process, rapid expansion of supercritical solutions and supercritical antisolvent precipitation (as well as several related methods) process a variety of substances into particles.

Due to its ability to selectively dissolve organic compounds and assist the functioning of enzymes, s has been suggested as a potential solvent to support biological activity on Venus- or super-Earth-type planets.

Manufactured products
Environmentally beneficial, low-cost substitutes for rigid thermoplastic and fired ceramic are made using s as a chemical reagent. The s in these processes is reacted with the alkaline components of fully hardened hydraulic cement or gypsum plaster to form various carbonates. The primary byproduct is water.

Supercritical carbon dioxide is used in the foaming of polymers. Supercritical carbon dioxide can saturate the polymer with solvent. Upon depressurization and heating the carbon dioxide rapidly expands, causing voids within the polymer matrix, i.e., creating a foam. Research is also ongoing at many universities in the production of microcellular foams using s.

An electrochemical carboxylation of a para-isobutylbenzyl chloride to ibuprofen is promoted under s.

Working fluid
Supercritical  is chemically stable, reliable, low-cost, non-flammable and readily available, making it a desirable candidate working fluid for transcritical cycles.

Supercritical  is used as the working fluid in high efficiency domestic water heat pumps. Manufactured and widely used, heat pumps are also commercially available for domestic and business heating and cooling. While some of the more common domestic water heat pumps remove heat from the space in which they are located, such as a basement or garage, the  heat pump water heaters are typically located outside, where they remove heat from the outside air.

Power generation 
The unique properties of s present advantages for closed-loop power generation and can be applied to various power generation applications. Power generation systems that use traditional air Brayton and steam Rankine cycles can be upgraded to s to increase efficiency and power output.

The relatively new Allam power cycle uses s as the working fluid in combination with fuel and pure oxygen. The  produced by combustion mixes with the s working fluid and a corresponding amount of pure  must be removed from the process (for industrial use or sequestration). This process reduces atmospheric emissions to zero.

It presents interesting properties that promise substantial improvements in system efficiency. Due to its high fluid density, s enables extremely compact and highly efficient turbomachinery. It can use simpler, single casing body designs while steam turbines require multiple turbine stages and associated casings, as well as additional inlet and outlet piping. The high density allows for highly compact, microchannel-based heat exchanger technology.

In 2016, General Electric announced a super-critical  based turbine that enabled a 50% efficiency of converting heat energy to electrical energy. It reaches full power in 2 minutes, whereas steam turbines need at least 30 minutes. The prototype generated 10 MW and is approximately 10% the size of a comparable steam turbine.

For concentrated solar power, carbon dioxide critical temperature is not high enough to obtain the maximum energy conversion efficiency. Solar thermal plants are usually located in arid areas, so it is impossible to cool down the heat sink to sub-critical temperatures. Therefore, supercritical carbon dioxide blends, with higher critical temperatures, are in development to improve concentrated solar power electricity production.

Further, due to its superior thermal stability and non-flammability, direct heat exchange from high temperature sources is possible, permitting higher working fluid temperatures and therefore higher cycle efficiency. Unlike two-phase flow, the single-phase nature of s eliminates the necessity of a heat input for phase change that is required for the water to steam conversion, thereby also eliminating associated thermal fatigue and corrosion.

Despite the promise of substantially higher efficiency and lower capital costs, the use of s presents corrosion engineering, material selection and design issues. Materials in power generation components must display resistance to damage caused by high-temperature, oxidation and creep. Candidate materials that meet these property and performance goals include incumbent alloys in power generation, such as nickel-based superalloys for turbomachinery components and austenitic stainless steels for piping. Components within s Brayton loops suffer from corrosion and erosion, specifically erosion in turbomachinery and recuperative heat exchanger components and intergranular corrosion and pitting in the piping.

Testing has been conducted on candidate Ni-based alloys, austenitic steels, ferritic steels and ceramics for corrosion resistance in s cycles. The interest in these materials derive from their formation of protective surface oxide layers in the presence of carbon dioxide, however in most cases further evaluation of the reaction mechanics and corrosion/erosion kinetics and mechanisms is required, as none of the materials meet the necessary goals.

Other 
Work is underway to develop a s closed-cycle gas turbine to operate at temperatures near 550 °C. This would have implications for bulk thermal and nuclear generation of electricity, because the supercritical properties of carbon dioxide at above 500 °C and 20 MPa enable thermal efficiencies approaching 45 percent. This could increase the electrical power produced per unit of fuel required by 40 percent or more. Given the volume of carbon fuels used in producing electricity, the environmental impact of cycle efficiency increases would be significant.

Supercritical  is an emerging natural refrigerant, used in new, low carbon solutions for domestic heat pumps. Supercritical  heat pumps are commercially marketed in Asia. EcoCute systems from Japan, developed by Mayekawa, develop high temperature domestic water with small inputs of electric power by moving heat into the system from the surroundings.

Supercritical  has been used since the 1980s to enhance recovery in mature oil fields.

"Clean coal" technologies are emerging that could combine such enhanced recovery methods with carbon sequestration. Using gasifiers instead of conventional furnaces, coal and water is reduced to hydrogen gas, carbon dioxide and ash. This hydrogen gas can be used to produce electrical power In combined cycle gas turbines,  is captured, compressed to the supercritical state and injected into geological storage, possibly into existing oil fields to improve yields. The unique properties of s ensure that it remains out of the atmosphere.

Supercritical  can be used as a working fluid for geothermal electricity generation in both enhanced geothermal systems and sedimentary geothermal systems (so-called  Plume Geothermal). EGS systems utilize an artificially fractured reservoir in basement rock while CPG systems utilize shallower naturally-permeable sedimentary reservoirs. As of 2011, the concept had not been tested in the field.

Aerogel production
Supercritical carbon dioxide is used in the production of silica, carbon and metal based aerogels. For example, silicon dioxide gel is formed and then exposed to s. When the  goes supercritical, all surface tension is removed, allowing the liquid to leave the aerogel and produce nanometer sized pores.

Sterilization of biomedical materials
Supercritical  is an alternative for thermal sterilization of biological materials and medical devices with combination of the additive peracetic acid (PAA). Supercritical  does not sterilize the media, because it does not kill the spores of microorganisms. Moreover, this process is gentle, as the morphology, ultrastructure and protein profiles of inactivated microbes are preserved.

Cleaning
Supercritical  is used in certain industrial cleaning processes.

See also
Caffeine
Dry cleaning
Perfume
Supercritical fluid
Atmosphere of Venus, nearly all carbon dioxide, supercritical at the surface

References

Further reading
 Mukhopadhyay M. (2000). Natural extracts using supercritical carbon dioxide. United States: CRC Press, LLC. Free preview at Google Books.

Carbon dioxide
Gas technologies
Industrial gases
Inorganic solvents